Pierre Barrère (1690, Perpignan – 1755, Perpignan) was a French physician and naturalist.

Pierre Barrère practised in Perpignan from 1717. In 1722, he voyaged to Cayenne where he stayed for five years. Back in Perpignan, he became professor of botany at the university and doctor in the military hospital.

Ornithology
In 1745 he published his Ornithologiae Specimen Novum, sive Series Avium in Ruscinone, Pyrenaeis Montibus, atque in Galliâ Aequinoctiali Observatarum, in Classes, genera & species, novâ methodo, digesta at Perpignan.

His classification, entirely based on the form of the beak and feet, divided the birds into four groups : les palmipèdes, les demi-palmipèdes, les fissipèdes et les demi-fissipèdes. Within these groups there was no rank above genera and species and these were more or less disordered. His very artificial classification was soon abandoned. The work was dedicated to Buffon.

Medicine
He published Observations anatomiques tirées des ouvertures d’un grand nombre de cadavres in 1753 at Perpignan.
As anonymous the Dissertation sur la cause physique de la couleur des nègres, de la qualité de leurs cheveux, et de la dégénération de l’un et de l’autre, Paris, chez Pierre-Guillaume Simon, 1741.

Fossils
He published in 1746 his Observations sur l'origine et la formation des pierres figurées, et sur celles qui, tant extérieurement qu'intérieurement, ont une figure régulière & déterminée at Paris. He was interested in the origin and the nature of fossils and described many from Catalonia and the Pyrenees. He proposed that the fossils of marine mollusks proved the presence of an ancient ocean.

His account of Guyana
Barrère published two more works, these on his observations in Guyana. These were Essai sur l'histoire naturelle de la France équinoxiale, ou Dénombrement des plantes, des animaux et des minéraux qui se trouvent dans l'isle de Cayenne, les isles de Remire, sur les côtes de la mer et dans le continent de la Guyane (1741) and Nouvelle Relation de la France équinoxiale, contenant la description des côtes de la Guiane, de l'île de Cayenne, le commerce de cette colonie, les divers changements arrivés dans ce pays, et les mœurs et coutumes des différents peuples sauvages qui l'habitent; avec les figures dessinées sur les lieux (1743).

References

Michael Walters (2003). A Concise History of Ornithology. Yale University Press (New Haven, Connecticut) 255 p. 
Translated from French Wikipedia

1690 births
1755 deaths
French ornithologists
18th-century French physicians
French zoologists
People from Perpignan